TARC may refer to:

 Taiwan Area Resident Certificate, an identification document for overseas Chinese and people from mainland China, Hong Kong, and Macau who reside in Taiwan
 Target Approval and Review Committee, a branch of the Canadian Security Intelligence Service
 Tax Administration Reform Commission, a committee appointed by the Government of India
 Team America Rocketry Challenge, an American model rocketry competition for high school studentshow
 The Amazing Race Canada, a Canadian TV-reality game
 Thymus and activation regulated chemokine, a gene which encodes a secreted protein of the immune system, also known as CCL17
 Total active reflection coefficient, a measure of multi-port radio antennas
 Transit Authority of River City, a major public transportation provider in Louisville, Kentucky, USA
 Truth and Reconciliation Commission (disambiguation), a government body tasked with uncovering past wrongdoing
 Tunku Abdul Rahman University College, in Malaysia
 Turkish Armenian Reconciliation Commission, an organisation established in 2001 to develop Armenia–Turkey relations
 Tyne Amateur Rowing Club, or Tyne Rowing Club, in Newcastle upon Tyne, UK